Nicaragua requires its residents to register their motor vehicles and display vehicle registration plates. Current plates are North American standard 6 × 12 inches (152 × 300 mm). In the background of the plate, it is represented the map of Nicaragua. The display of letters and numbers is one or two letters that identifies the region and a group of serial numbers.

References

Nicaragua
Road transport in Nicaragua
Nicaragua transport-related lists